Calonarius osloensis is a species of fungus in the family Cortinariaceae.

Taxonomy 
The species was described in 2014 and classified as Cortinarius osloensis.

In 2022 the species was transferred from Cortinarius and reclassified as Calonarius osloensis based on genomic data.

Habitat and distribution 

It is native to Norway.

References

External links

osloensis
Fungi of Europe